The following is a list of the freshwater fish species of the Isle of Man. There are ten recorded species. The list has been generated from FishBase.

Anguilliformes

Anguillidae
 Anguilla anguilla 
European eel (Manx: Astan) (native)

Salmoniformes

Salmonidae
 Coregonus lavaretus 
Common whitefish (questionable)

 Salmo salar 
Atlantic salmon (Manx: Braddan) (native)

 Salmo trutta trutta 
Sea trout (native)

Gasterosteiformes

Gasterosteidae
 Gasterosteus aculeatus aculeatus 
Three spined stickleback (Manx: Jacksharp) (native)

Perciformes

Gobiidae
 Gobius paganellus 
Rock goby (native)

Petromyzontiformes

Petromyzontidae
 Lampetra fluviatilis 
European River Lamprey (native)

Syngnathiformes

Syngnathidae
 Nerophis ophidion 
Straight nosed pipefish (native)

Osmeriformes

Osmeridae
 Osmerus eperlanus 
European smelt (native)

Petromyzontiformes

Petromyzontidae
 Petromyzon marinus 
Sea lamprey (native)

References

Isle of Man